The 2018 Manly Warringah Sea Eagles season was the 69th in the club's history since their entry into the then New South Wales Rugby Football League premiership in 1947. The team came second last in the regular season and did not qualify for the finals.

Signings/Transfers

Gains

Losses

Ladder

Fixtures

Regular season

References

Manly Warringah Sea Eagles seasons
Manly-Warringah Sea Eagles season